NUSSE (Norsk Universell Siffermaskin, Sekvensstyrt, Elektronisk) was the first Norwegian electronic computer.

It was constructed from 1950 through 1955 and unveiled at the University of Oslo in 1954 to an enthusiastic reception. The machine is considered to have played an important role in developing the commercial use of computers in Norway.

The environment around the NUSSE computer was the birthplace of the AUTOKON CAD/CAM system.

The computer is now on exhibit at the Norwegian Museum of Science and Technology.

References

1950s computers
Computer-related introductions in 1954
1954 in Norway
University of Oslo